Long Street Church is a historic Presbyterian church located near Fayetteville in Hoke County, North Carolina. It was built in 1850, and is a two-story rectangular frame building five bays wide and three deep.  It is set on fieldstone and concrete foundation piers and has a hip roof. The front facade features a full height porch and Palladian window in the Classical Revival style.  In 1921 the United States Government purchased the church and six acres of land as part of the Fort Bragg Military Reservation.

It was listed on the National Register of Historic Places in 1974.

References

Churches in Fayetteville, North Carolina
Presbyterian churches in North Carolina
Churches on the National Register of Historic Places in North Carolina
Neoclassical architecture in North Carolina
Churches completed in 1850
19th-century churches in the United States
Buildings and structures in Hoke County, North Carolina
National Register of Historic Places in Hoke County, North Carolina
Neoclassical church buildings in the United States